La Mamounia is a five-star hotel in Marrakech, Morocco, opposite the Kutubiyya Mosque. It is one of The Leading Hotels of the World. For several years, Condé Nast Traveler has named La Mamounia as the best hotel in the world. "Mamounia" means "safe haven" in the Arabic language.

The hotel has 135 rooms (with each room covering 30 to 45 square meters), 71 suites (with each suite covering 55 to 212 square meters), and 3 riads (with each covering 700 square meters) for rent.

Notable guests have included politicians such as Charles de Gaulle, Winston Churchill, Franklin D. Roosevelt, Nelson Mandela, Ronald Reagan, and Helmut Kohl; entertainment industry stars include Kirk Douglas, Paul McCartney, Charlie Chaplin, and Omar Sharif, and athletes such as Zinedine Zidane.

History
The hotel was conceived in 1923 by architects Henri Prost and Antoine Marchisio on the 15-hectare palace and garden that Sultan Mohammed ben Abdallah gave to his son, Moulay Mamoun in the 18th century. The hotel opened in 1929 and combines Moroccan architecture with the Art Deco style.

In a 1935 letter to his wife, Winston Churchill wrote about the hotel; "This is a wonderful place, and the hotel is one of the best I have ever used". One of the bars at the hotel is now named after Churchill.

La Mamounia was a filming location for Alfred Hitchcock's film The Man Who Knew Too Much, starring James Stewart and Doris Day in 1956.

"Mamunia" was written by Paul McCartney in 1973 whilst staying at the hotel.

In September 2009, the hotel reopened after being closed for a 3-year renovation. The renovation was led by designer Jacques Garcia. It added more reds, yellow and black colors to the design as well as LED displays to be used for advertising. The removal of a number of original features during this renovation was criticized.

From 2010 to 2015, the hotel offered the La Mamounia literary award, a Moroccan literary prize of 200,000 Moroccan dirhams.

In 2019, the government of Morocco announced that state-owned railway company ONCF would sell a 60% stake it owned in the hotel in a privatization deal in order to cut its debt.

In 2020, the mansion, its four restaurants, four bars, and various pavilions were renovated. Chefs Pierre Hermé and Jean-Georges Vongerichten each redesigned one of the restaurants.

Facilities 
The riads are each composed of three bathrooms, salons, private swimming pools and terraces. It has signature restaurants by chefs Pierre Hermé and Jean-Georges Vongerichten. The hotel also includes a 20-acre garden, colonnaded courtyards, a spa, and a health club in a glass cube.

See also

References

External links

 

Buildings and structures in Marrakesh
Hotel buildings completed in 1929
Hotels established in 1929
Hotels in Morocco
Palaces in Marrakesh
The Leading Hotels of the World
20th-century architecture in Morocco